Gleave is a surname. Notable people with the surname include:

Elliot Gleave (born 1982), better known by his stage name. For example, English singer, songwriter, and rapper
Lisa Gleave (born 1976), Australian-American glamour model and TV personality
Tom Gleave (1908–1993), RAF pilot